"Win Some Lose Some" is a song by English recording artist Robbie Williams. It was released in New Zealand in 2000 as the fifth and last single from his second studio album, I've Been Expecting You (1998). Nicole Appleton of English girl group All Saints provides the "I love you baby" telephone voice on the song.

Released in 2000, "Win Some Lose Some" became another top-10 hit for Williams in New Zealand, peaking at number seven; it spent four weeks inside the top 10 and 21 weeks overall on the chart. The song was included on the New Zealand version of Williams' Greatest Hits album in 2004.

Track listing
New Zealand CD single
 "Win Some Lose Some" – 4:18
 "Phoenix from the Flames" – 4:02
 "The Full Monty Medley" (with Tom Jones) – 5:28

Credits and personnel
Credits are lifted from the I've Been Expecting You album booklet.

Studio
 Mastered at Metropolis Mastering (London, England)

Personnel

 Robbie Williams – writing, vocals
 Guy Chambers – writing, keyboards, organ, production, arrangement
 Gary Nuttall – background vocals
 "Planet" Claire Worrall – backing vocals
 Nicole Appleton – telephone voice
 Alex Dickson – acoustic guitar, electric guitar
 David Catlin-Birch – bass guitar
 Chris Sharrock – drums
 Andy Duncan – percussion
 Steve Power – production, recording, mixing, programming
 Steve McNichol – programming
 Tony Cousins – mastering

Charts

Weekly charts

Year-end charts

References

1998 songs
2000 singles
Chrysalis Records singles
Robbie Williams songs
Song recordings produced by Guy Chambers
Song recordings produced by Steve Power
Songs written by Guy Chambers
Songs written by Robbie Williams